Gattinara is a comune (municipality) in the Province of Vercelli in the Italian region of Piedmont, located about  northeast of Turin and about  north of Vercelli.

Gattinara is notable for its red wine.

Gattinara borders the following municipalities: Ghemme, Lenta, Lozzolo, Roasio, Romagnano Sesia, Rovasenda, Prato Sesia and Serravalle Sesia.

Demographic evolution

Notable residents
 Mercurino Arborio (1465–1530), marchese di Gattinara, statesman and jurist
 Angelo Martino Colombo (1935–2014), footballer
 Piero Gibellino (born 1926), retired Italian professional football player

References

External links
 www.comune.gattinara.vc.it/

 
Cities and towns in Piedmont
Wine regions of Italy